Joychandi Pahar is a hill which is a popular tourist attraction in the Indian state of West Bengal in Purulia district. It is two kilometres from the subdivisional town of Raghunathpur and four kilometres from Adra town. The hill is situated 2 kilometers south from Purulia – Barakar road via Nanduara village and 1 kilometer west from Raghunathpur-Adra Road via a growing township known as Annapurna pally. It is also just four kilometres away from Adra Junction railway station and 1.5 kilometres from Joychandipahar railway station, which is situated on Adra-Asansol section. Joychandi hill is a popular tourist centre and major attraction for rock climbing. Joychandi Pahar railway station is on the Asansol – Adra section of South Eastern Railway, in the state capital of Kolkata. The other rock climbing centre nearby is at Susunia Pahar.

Geography

Location

Area overview
Purulia district forms the lowest step of the Chota Nagpur Plateau. The general scenario is undulating land with scattered hills.Raghunathpur subdivision occupies the north-western part of the district. 83.80% of the population of the subdivision  lives in rural areas. However, there are pockets of urbanization and 16.20% of the population lives in urban areas. There are 14 census towns in the subdivision. It is presented in the map given alongside. There is a coal mining area around Parbelia and two thermal power plants are there – the 500 MW Santaldih Thermal Power Station and the 1200 MW Raghunathpur Thermal Power Station. The subdivision has a rich heritage of old temples, some of them belonging to the 11th century or earlier. The Banda Deul is a monument of national importance. The comparatively more recent in historical terms, Panchkot Raj has interesting and intriguing remains in the area.

Note: The map alongside presents some of the notable locations in the subdivision. All places marked in the map are linked in the larger full screen map.

Festival 
Every Year A Festival is held in the foothills after the Christmas and this Festival usually continues to 1 January or 2 January. This Festival often becomes tourist attraction and also motivates local artists. This Festival Gives all local artists to show their skills. The Festival Often referred as Joychandi Pahar Pariyatan Utsav।

Fiction

The Bengali film directed by Satyajit Ray, Hirak Rajar Deshe was mostly shot in this mountain area.

Gallery

References 

Hills of West Bengal
Tourist attractions in Purulia district